Kakavaberd is an abandoned village in the Artashat Municipality of the Ararat Province of Armenia.

References

Populated places in Ararat Province